The WCT Finals was a men's tennis tournament that served as the season-ending championship for the World Championship Tennis circuit. From 1971–1989 the event was held annually in Texas on indoor carpet courts. The 1971 quarterfinals and semifinals were played in Houston, and final played at Moody Coliseum in Dallas.  The 1972–1979 editions were played at Moody Coliseum, and the 1980–1989 tournaments at Reunion Arena in Dallas.  The 1974 edition was the first tennis tournament to experiment with electronic line calling. The first edition of the WCT Finals was in November 1971, just a few days before the equivalent event of the rival Grand Prix circuit. But the second edition occurred just six months later to accommodate NBC's new tennis coverage; the tournament final between Ken Rosewall and Rod Laver is credited as "the match that made tennis in the United States" because its unprecedented domestic television audience of 23 million fueled a massive increase in the sport's popularity. The ensuing editions were also held in the spring. John McEnroe had the most overall success, winning a record five titles. Because of the popularity of the 1972 final, another edition, less important and with half the prize money, was held in November in Rome. The prize money offered to the winner, Arthur Ashe, was US$25,000 compared to the US$50,000 won by Ken Rosewall for the main edition in May. A decade later there were three editions of the WCT Finals; the most important one in Dallas, and the others in autumn in Naples, Italy, and in winter (in January 1983) in Detroit. The tournament was sponsored by Buick between 1985 and 1986, a brand of General Motors, and was called the "Buick WCT Finals".

Finals

Seasonal finals events

Records

Won without dropping a set: John McEnroe (1981, 1948)
Singles–doubles titles winners: Stan Smith (S–D), John McEnroe (S–D)

See also
WCT World Doubles
Grand Slam Cup
ATP Finals

References

External links
ATP tournament archive

 
Finals
Defunct tennis tournaments in the United States
Indoor tennis tournaments
Carpet court tennis tournaments
Sports in Dallas
1971 establishments in Texas
1989 disestablishments in Texas
Recurring sporting events established in 1971
Recurring sporting events disestablished in 1989